Rubens Paiva (December 26, 1929 – January 20, 1971) was a Brazilian civil engineer and politician who, as a Congressman at the Brazilian Chamber of Deputies, opposed the implementation of a military dictatorship in Brazil in 1968. Due to his involvement with subversive activities, he was apprehended by the military forces and subsequently tortured and murdered.

Biography

Early life
Rubens Paiva was born in Santos, São Paulo. He was son of Jaime Almeida Paiva, a lawyer and a farmer, and Araci Beyrodt. He was married to Maria Lucrécia Eunice Facciolla Paiva, with whom he had five children: Marcelo Rubens Paiva, Vera Silvia Facciolla Paiva, Maria Eliana Facciolla Paiva, Ana Lucia Facciolla Paiva and Maria Beatriz Facciolla Paiva.

He graduated from the Universidade Presbiteriana Mackenzie, in São Paulo, with a BA in Civil Engineering in 1954. He joined the "Oil is ours" nationalist campaign as a member of the student council. During his college years, he was the president of the Academic Center of the Civil Engineering Students and vice-president for the São Paulo Union of Students.

Political career
Paiva's political career began to rise in October 1962, when he was elected Congressman for the State of São Paulo by the Brazilian Labour Party. He took office in February of the next year and became a member of the Congressional Committee created to examine the activities of both the Institute for Social Research and Studies (Instituto de Pesquisas e Estudos Sociais) and the Brazilian Institute for Democratic Action (Instituto Brasileiro de Ação Democrática). Those two organizations were under the suspicion of funding commentators and writers who warned about the "red menace" in Brazil. The Committee also accused some high-ranked military officers of receiving bribery from the two aforementioned foreign entities, in a scheme that supposedly financed the upcoming military coup d'état on March 31st 1964. The Investigation Committee however, never presented any proof of such allegations. After the Brazilian government overthrown in 1964, Paiva, among other politicians, had his congressional position revoked by the junta on April 10, 1964.

Exile and return
Shortly after the coup, Rubens Paiva voluntarily left Brazil for self-exiles in Yugoslavia and in Paris, France. Nine months later, he was supposed to fly to Buenos Aires for a meeting with the deposed left-wing leaders João Goulart and Leonel Brizola. During the lay over in Rio de Janeiro though, he said to the flight hostess that he would be momentarily leaving the plane to buy cigarettes. Instead, he boarded on a flight to São Paulo, heading to his house, where his wife and children lived. Paiva then moved with his family to Rio de Janeiro and returned to work as a civil engineer, while continuing to collaborate with and assist exiled left-wing militants and guerrilla members inside and outside the Brazilian territory.

Rubens Paiva founded, alongside editor Fernando Gasparian, the newspaper Jornal de Debates and was the last director of Última Hora in São Paulo, before Samuel Weiner sold it to Octávio Frias' Grupo Folha.

When returning from a trip to Santiago, Chile, where he had been helping the exiled guerrillera daughter of his friend Bocaiúva Cunha, Paiva was mistakenly identified as a contact of "Adriano", which was the contact of Carlos Lamarca, then the top name on the most wanted terrorists list kept by Brazil's dictatorship regime.

Arrest and disappearance
Hoping to catch "Adriano" and thus reach Lamarca, the military forces raided Paiva's house in Rio de Janeiro and arrested him on January 20, 1971. The action was conducted by armed men that claimed to be members of the Brazilian Air Force.

After the raid, Paiva was reported missing. According to documents published by the Brazilian military, the car that was conducting Paiva to the Centro de Operações de Defesa Interna (Center for Internal Defense Operations) prison was forcibly stopped by unknown individuals that rescued him.

Eunice, Paiva's wife, was also arrested during the same operation and remained incommunicable for twelve days. Eliana, one of the couple's daughter, then a 15-year-old young woman, was in the same prison for 24 hours. Eunice and Eliana were interrogated in the same DOI-CODI room where suspected communist agents were tortured. They claim to have seen blood, the feared pau de arara and the portrait of Paiva in the tokens of recognition. They also said to have heard the screams from prisoners apparently being tortured.

While his wife and daughter were being interrogated, Paiva was transferred to the Destacamento de Operações Internas (Department of Internal Operations). Though his body was never found, accounts given decades later to the National Truth Commission by an Army doctor and former military officers revealed that Paiva died on the second day after his arrest from injuries related to torture in the Army barrack where he had been held.

In a 1971 letter, Eunice Paiva wrote, based on accounts by other political prisoners, that her husband was tortured on the same day she was arrested at the III Aerial Zone, located near Santos Dumont Airport, then under the command of João Paulo Burnier, also accused of torturing and killing Stuart Angel.

Rubens Paiva in the StB Archives
In the Czech State Security (StB) archives in Prague, in the folder nº 11,778, entitled 'People of Political and Economic Life in Brazil', there are two letters with official reports on Rubens Paiva. Both reports were written on March 27, 1964 by a Czech communist political police chief and secret agent operating in Brazil, codenamed Moldán.

The contents of the report explain why Moldán [or rather Josef Mejstřík], took interest in Paiva. With the help of the Brazilian journalist and communist agent Maria da Graça Dutra and agents Losada and Lenco, a mapping of the ideological spectrum of several Brazilian politicians was carried out, in order to catalog the respective political orientation of each one of them. The motivation that led Moldán to carry out this work was not due to a specific intelligence task, but an official request made by the Czechoslovak ambassador in the course of his legal diplomatic activities. However, all the information collected about Paiva was sent to the headquarters of the intelligence of StB, because that acquired content, sooner or later, could be useful for the Czech Communist Party.

The Czech spy's report on Rubens Paiva says:

"Rubens Paiva, congressmember and leader in one of the Congressional committees. He belongs to a more leftist wing of his party, and he is part of the so-called 'Compact Group', which reunites the most radical congressmembers under the influence of the Brazilian Communist Party, along with other radical leftist fringes. Rubens Paiva is known as a radical leftist congressman, but he does not call himself a communist. [...]  I met him last year, sometime in late May during my visit to the House of Representatives Committee on Foreign Affairs, and he was introduced to me along with other members of that committee.  

I verified this earlier with the help of Maria da Graça Dutra, Losada and Lenco, along with many other names. […] All three responded in a consistent assessment of Paiva as being a radical nationalist and politically combative leader. Apparently, however, he is not a member of the Communist Party." 

In Moldán's second note, dated from the same day, the above information was completed. He wrote that he was convinced he could use the report to carry out active operations involving Paiva, to exploit his role in the Brazilian parliament. The Czech agent states that his contacts with the congressman would intensify and, according to the results, he would see if how far he could go.

The recruitment, however, ended up never happening. The StB documents are dated from March 27, 1964 and the military coup d'état in Brazil that put communist militants on the run or in prison took place only four days later.

See also
List of kidnappings
List of solved missing person cases

References 

1929 births
1970s missing person cases
1971 deaths
20th-century Brazilian engineers
Brazilian torture victims
Dead and missing in the fight against the military dictatorship in Brazil (1964–1985)
Enforced disappearances in Brazil
Formerly missing people
Male murder victims
Missing person cases in Brazil
People from Santos, São Paulo